István Varga may refer to:

 István Varga (handballer) (1943–2014), Hungarian handball player
 István Varga (judoka) (born 1960), Hungarian judoka
 István Varga (politician, born 1956), Hungarian politician and economist
 István Varga (politician, born 1953), Hungarian lawyer and politician